During the 2017–18 season, Real Betis participated in La Liga and the Copa del Rey.

Squad

Current squad

Transfers
List of Spanish football transfers summer 2017#Real Betis

In

Out

Competitions

Overall

La Liga

League table

Matches

Copa del Rey

Round of 32

Statistics

Appearances and goals
Last updated on 20 May 2018.

|-
! colspan=14 style=background:#dcdcdc; text-align:center|Goalkeepers

|-
! colspan=14 style=background:#dcdcdc; text-align:center|Defenders

|-
! colspan=14 style=background:#dcdcdc; text-align:center|Midfielders

|-
! colspan=14 style=background:#dcdcdc; text-align:center|Forwards

|-
! colspan=14 style=background:#dcdcdc; text-align:center| Players who have made an appearance or had a squad number this season but have left the club either permanently or on loan
|-

|}

Cards
Accounts for all competitions. Last updated on 19 December 2017.

Clean sheets
Last updated on 19 December 2017.

References

Real Betis seasons
Real Betis